Star WallowingBull (born 1973) is an Objibwe Native American of the White Earth Nation, as well as an artist and illustrator known for his signature Prismacolor style of drawing, and representation of Native American Art in a modern art style. His art style portrays symbolic about Native American identity in the US, internal struggles faced by cultural clashing, and other issues WallowingBull finds concerning, such as environmental care.

Biography

Early life 
Star WallowingBull was born August 18, 1973, in Minneapolis, Minnesota, and is a descendant of the Ojibwe and Arapahoe Native American Tribes. Influenced heavily by his father Frank Big Bear, a prominent Ojibwe artist, WallowingBull started drawing at 8 months old and continued to be influenced by Native American Art, Pop Art scene, and European Art Masters in his home of Minneapolis. But as he grew up, he struggled with personal conflicts in his life causing him to drop out of high school and leading him into a path of alcoholism. He eventually used art and these influences to develop a modern style of autobiographically portraying the struggles of Native American life in a time where Native American people, were still adjusting into a new way of life and law in the United States.

Later life  
Frank Big Bear being a prominent artist himself connected his son to art dealer Todd Bockley, who jump started WallowingBulls' career by showcasing it at the Weisman Art Museum in Minneapolis. Many art collectors were drawn in by his signature art form use of Prismacolor colored pencils, which provided a metallic tone to his collage-like drawings. The Native Arts and Cultures Foundations describes his work as "[employing] colored pencil on paper and acrylic on canvas to explore intersections of American Indian and U.S. pop culture in the 21st Century." An example of one of his earlier art pieces would be Black Elk’s Little Sand Man, a piece that represented a contrast showing symbols of different indigenous Native American cultures against symbols of what the masses in the US perceive to be indigenous culture. His work is a representation of the conflicting layers of identity held by generations of Native American people, as they have faced prejudice and unwarranted conflict through colonial influences.

A significant influence came later into Star Wallowing Bulls' life in 2005 when he met his mentor-to-be James Rosenquist in Fargo, North Dakota. While suffering from hand pain, Rosenquist taught Wallowing Bull the art of painting and gave him a $1000 and a full set of tools to start painting. Rosenquist would teach Wallowing Bull the art form he would carry on throughout most of his work after the use of colored pencils caused health issues in his hands.

Recent activity 
Currently, Star Wallowing Bull actively goes around to schools of different levels teaching art near his home of Minneapolis as well as throughout parts of North Dakota and the Midwest.

Artwork

Plains Art Museum Mural 
This mural, commissioned by the Plains Art Museum in Fargo, North Dakota, was a piece done in 2003 by Wallowing Bull along with his father Frank Big Bear. Contrary to a lot of other work by Wallowing Bull, this piece had a lot heavier influence from native art styles and motifs. This piece still uses very bright colors, portraying native birds flying around heads of gods surrounded by abstract patterns. There is also a quote in the top right corner stating "I will not be there. I will not fall. Bury my heart at Wounded Knee." referring to the Wounded Knee massacre and paying homage to the struggles faced by indigenous people of past generations.

American Dreamers 
This piece of prismacolor art is full of bright colours and portrays a Native American chief in the front with another Native holding a gun. Other Native elements such as deer appear, but are all contrasted by a hundred dollar bill in the background and faces prominent in American society such as Martin Luther King and John F. Kennedy. This piece, published in 2000, reflects into how Wallowing Bull felt growing up influence by two societies he had to conform to. This piece, evident in the name itself, symbolizes that the American Dreamers in the background of the picture resemble the same spirit the Native American people have in an effort to search for their identity.

Clown Face 
One of his more environmentally geared pieces of art, this piece was released in 2010 and printed in 2015 for the New Art 2.0 print for Eiteljorg Museum. This piece has abstract colors and elements and features a man drawn in abstract native pattern. We also see rain, drawn in a similarly abstract manner, falling from the sky and hitting the man in the arm causing his arm to burn. This is an environmental pursuit and commentary on smog and acid rain affecting people as well as crops, and done in a way where inverse tones are used to create a powerful image.

Exhibitions

Solo exhibitions

Select group exhibitions

Collections 

 British Museum  
 National Museum of the American Indian
 Plains Art Museum 
 Weisman Art Museum 
 Tweed Museum of Art
 Nerman Museum of Contemporary Art

Honors and awards 

 Native Arts and Cultures Foundation - Regional Artist Fellowship
Fellowship studying history of Araphoe tribe and maintaining their cultural traditions through art
 Bush Foundation - Bush Artist Fellowship
 Plains Art Museum, Art on the Plains 6 - Juror Award
 Smithsonian National Museum of the American Indian - Native Artist Fellowship

References

External links 
 http://starwallowingbull.blogspot.com/

Arapaho people
1973 births
Living people
Ojibwe people
Artists from Minneapolis
American male artists